The Peugeot Type 33 was a small four-seater phaeton produced in 1901 and 1902.  Peugeot's by-now familiar V-twin engine displaced 1056 cc.  A total of 84 were made.

References
Peugeot Type 33 at Histomobile
Peugeot Car Models 1889-1909

Type 33
Cars introduced in 1901
1900s cars
Rear-engined vehicles
Veteran vehicles